Ranote is a village in the Thathri tehsil of Doda district in the union territory of Jammu and Kashmir, India.

About and demographics

About
It is listed in Jia panchayat.

Demographics
Ranote village is a backward village having population of 600 people. The people generally are very poor and depends upon agricultural activities. The spoken languages of people are Bhaderwahi, Bhalessi, Gojri, Kashmiri and Sarazi.

Culture
There is an festival called Mahal Nag Mela, celebrated annually. Number of pilgrims visit this village for performing this cultural festival.

References

Villages in Doda district
Chenab Valley